Sparmos is a village of the Elassona municipality. Before the 2011 local government reform it was a part of the municipality of Olympos. The 2011 census recorded 126 inhabitants in the village. Sparmos is a part of the community of Olympiada.

History 
The settlement is recorded as village and as "Isparmo" in the Ottoman Tahrir Defter number 367 dating to 1530.

Population
According to the 2011 census, the population of the settlement of Sparmos was 126 people, a decrease of almost 7% compared with the population of the previous census of 2001.

See also
 List of settlements in the Larissa regional unit
 Agia Triada Monastery, Sparmos

References

Populated places in Larissa (regional unit)